Puerto Rico Highway 504 (PR-504) is a tertiary state highway in Ponce, Puerto Rico. The road runs north to south, and mostly along Río Chiquito in barrio Portugués Rural. Its southern terminus is at an intersection with PR-503, near PR-10 at the southern edge of barrio Portugués.

The road is a mountainous two-way one-lane road and thus very difficult to navigate when traffic is coming from the opposite direction. In addition most of the road has numerous steep sharp curves and should be driven only with vehicles in top mechanical condition, preferably all-wheel drive sedans, as drivers of SUVs reportedly feel less in control of their vehicles. The road should not be driven after nightfall.

The road is 6.7 kilometers long. At kilometer mark 3.0, PR-504 connects with PR-588 (also known as "Camino Pandora" or "Camino Río Chiquito") heading west towards Sector El Hoyo. PR-588's northern terminus is at kilometer 7.2 of PR-505 in Barrio Montes Llanos.

Major intersections

See also

 List of highways in Ponce, Puerto Rico
 List of highways numbered 504

References

External links
 
 Guía de Carreteras Principales, Expresos y Autopistas 

504
Roads in Ponce, Puerto Rico